Frank Tinnemeier (born 25 August 1972) is a German Paralympic athlete who competes in shot put at international elite events. He is a three-time world medalist and a European champion, who has also competed at the Paralympic Games three times.

References

External links
 
 

1972 births
Living people
People from Lemgo
Sportspeople from Detmold (region)
Paralympic athletes of Germany
German male shot putters
Athletes (track and field) at the 2008 Summer Paralympics
Athletes (track and field) at the 2012 Summer Paralympics
Athletes (track and field) at the 2016 Summer Paralympics
Medalists at the World Para Athletics Championships
Medalists at the World Para Athletics European Championships
Shot putters with limb difference
Paralympic shot putters
21st-century German people